David Aldous (born 1952) is a mathematician.

David Aldous may also refer to:

 David Aldous (actor), English actor and broadcaster
 David Aldous, stock car driver, see List of 2008 motorsport champions